"Sweet Home Chicago" is a blues standard first recorded by Robert Johnson in 1936.  Although he is often credited as the songwriter, several songs have been identified as precedents. The song has become a popular anthem for the city of Chicago despite ambiguity in Johnson's original lyrics.  Numerous artists have interpreted the song in a variety of styles.

Earlier songs
The melody of "Sweet Home Chicago" is found in several blues songs, including "Honey Dripper Blues", "Red Cross Blues", and the immediate model for the song, "Kokomo Blues".  The lyrics for "Honey Dripper Blues No. 2" by Edith North Johnson follow a typical AAB structure:

Lucille Bogan's (as Bessie Jackson) "Red Cross Man" uses an AB plus refrain structure:

Blues historian Elijah Wald suggests that Scrapper Blackwell was the first to introduce a reference to a city in his "Kokomo Blues", using a AAB verse:

"Kokola Blues", recorded by Madlyn Davis a year earlier in 1927, also references Kokomo, Indiana, in the refrain:

In 1932, Jabo Williams recorded "Ko Ko Mo Blues," with the same refrain, but included a counting line: "One and two is three, four and five and six".  James Arnold laid claim to the song in 1933, styling himself Kokomo Arnold and naming his version "Old Original Kokomo Blues".  He later explained the song's references "eleven light city" referred to a Chicago drugstore where a girlfriend worked and "Koko" was their brand name of coffee. Papa Charlie McCoy (using the sobriquet "the Mississippi Mudder") changed the reference to Baltimore, Maryland, in "Baltimore Blues".  This had more name recognition to the Southern blues audience than Kokomo, Indiana.

Johnson's adaptation
On November 23, 1936, in San Antonio, Texas, Robert Johnson recorded "Sweet Home Chicago".  He changed the character of the song to one of aspirational migration, replacing "back to Kokomo" with "to Chicago", and replacing "that eleven light city" with another migrational goal "that land of California". 

Johnson sang this as the first verse and used it as the refrain. Otherwise, his verses retained the structure of Arnold's recording, with similar counting verses.  Johnson succeeded in evoking an exotic modern place, far from the South, which is an amalgam of famous migration goals for African Americans leaving the South. To later singers this contradictory location held more appeal than obscure Kokomo. Tommy McClennan's "Baby Don't You Want To Go" (1939) and Walter Davis's "Don't You Want To Go" (1941) were both based on Johnson's chorus. Later singers used Johnson's chorus and dropped the arithmetical verses.

Johnson uses a driving guitar rhythm and a high, near-falsetto vocal for the song. His guitar accompaniment does not use Kokomo Arnold's bottleneck guitar style.  Instead, he adapted the boogie piano accompaniments of Roosevelt Sykes to "Honey Dripper" and by Walter Roland to "Red Cross" to guitar.  Leroy Carr's "Baby Don't You Love Me No More" (with Leroy Carr on piano and Scrapper Blackwell on guitar) shares the rhythmic approach and the feel of Johnson's initial two verses.

Lyric interpretation
The lyrics only obliquely refer to Chicago itself, in the song's refrain, where the song narrator pleads for a woman to go with him back to "that land of California, to my sweet home Chicago".  Indeed, California is mentioned in the song more than Chicago, both during this refrain and in one of the stanzas ("I'm goin' to California/ from there to Des Moines, Iowa").  These perplexing lyrics have been a source of controversy for many years. In the 1960s and 1970s, some commentators speculated this was a geographical mistake on Johnson's part. However, Johnson was a sophisticated songwriter and used geographical references in a number of his songs.

One interpretation is that Johnson intended the song to be a metaphorical description of an imagined paradise combining elements of the American north and west, far from the racism and poverty inherent to the Mississippi Delta of 1936.  Like Chicago, California was a common such destination in many Great Depression-era songs, books, and movies.  Music writer Max Haymes argues that Johnson's intention was "the land of California or that sweet home Chicago". Another suggests it is a reference to Chicago's California Avenue, a thoroughfare that predates Johnson's recording and which runs from the far south to the far north side of the city.

A more sophisticated and humorous interpretation has the narrator pressuring a woman to leave town with him for Chicago, but his blatant geographic ignorance reveals his attempt at deceit.  Another explanation is that Johnson was conveying a trip across the country, as mentioned in the line, "I'm going to California/from there to Des Moines, Iowa", and that the end destination was Chicago, Illinois, a state sharing borders with Iowa. Writer Alan Greenberg mentions that Johnson had a remote relative who lived in Port Chicago, California, which could add ambiguity as to which Chicago the lyrics are actually referring.  Finally, using the same tune, Sam Montgomery sang of a land "where the sweet old oranges grow" in a song by that name.  It is unclear whether the reference to oranges (a California cash crop) was corrective of Johnson's geographical confusion or reflective of an earlier song that Johnson changed.

As the song grew to be a homage to Chicago, the original lyrics that refer to California were altered in most subsequent renditions. The line "back to the land of California" is changed to "back to the same old place", and the line "I'm going to California" becomes "I'm going back to Chicago". This altered version dates to pianist Roosevelt Sykes.

Legacy

"Sweet Home Chicago" is a popular blues standard for professional and semi-professional music artists and many of them have recorded it in a variety of styles.  Steve LaVere, the manager of Johnson's recording legacy, commented, "It's like 'When the Saints Go Marching In' to the blues crowd".

In 1958, Junior Parker recorded the song as an upbeat ensemble shuffle, with harmonica accompaniment. Duke Records released it as a single, which reached number 13 on the Billboard R&B chart. Duke included a songwriting credit for Roosevelt Sykes, who recorded the song as "Sweet Old Chicago" in 1955. Neither Sykes nor Parker included a reference to California, a practice that is followed by subsequent performers.

In 1967, Chicago blues musician Magic Sam recorded a version for his influential album West Side Soul. Stephen Thomas Erlewine commented in an album review:

The Blues Brothers, the fictional group fronted by comedians Dan Aykroyd and John Belushi, performed it in the climatic concert scene of the 1980 film The Blues Brothers. In the song's intro, Belushi's character announces, "dedicate[d] to the late great Magic Sam".

On February 21, 2012, Barack Obama and Michelle Obama hosted, "In Performance at the White House: Red, White and Blues", a celebration of blues music held in the East Room of the White House.  President Obama began by describing the origins of blues in the South and added "The music migrated northfrom Mississippi Delta to Memphis to my hometown in Chicago". Later, encouraged by Buddy Guy and B.B. King, he joined in singing the first verse of "Sweet Home Chicago".

References

1936 songs
Blues songs
Chicago Cubs
Chicago White Sox
Chicago Bears
Chicago Bulls
Chicago Blackhawks
Foghat songs
Junior Parker songs
Robert Johnson songs
Roosevelt Sykes songs
Songs about Chicago
Songs written by Robert Johnson
The Blues Brothers songs
Song recordings produced by Don Law